Bretton may refer to:

Places

England
Bretton, Derbyshire
Bretton, Peterborough in Cambridgeshire
Monk Bretton in South Yorkshire
West Bretton in West Yorkshire
Bretton Hall College of Education
Bretton Hall, West Yorkshire
Monk Bretton Priory, South Yorkshire

Wales
Bretton, Flintshire

Other uses
Bretton (name), list of people with the name
Bretton (EP), a 2008 record by Lower Than Atlantis
Bretton's, former Canadian high-end department store

See also
 Bretton Woods (disambiguation)
 Bretton Hall (disambiguation)
 Bretten (disambiguation)
 Brenton (disambiguation)
 Breton (disambiguation)